Ferring  is a village, civil parish and electoral ward in the Arun District of West Sussex, England.

In the 2001 census 4361 people lived in 2179 households, of whom 1423 were economically active.  The area's seafront is pedestrianised and the beach itself is a mixture of shingle and pebble, reinforced by groynes. The population at the 2011 Census was 4,480.

History
The site of the village is an ancient one: the name itself is Saxon; it is mentioned in the Domesday Book; the parish church is Norman, and is dedicated to St Andrew.  In the churchyard are buried the ashes of Major John Bigelow Dodge (1894-1960), veteran of the Great Escape of 1944, and there is a Commonwealth war grave of a Royal Sussex Regiment officer of World War II.

Until the 1920s the village was a small one; when the south coast began to be built-up, particularly with holiday homes, Ferring began to increase in size.

Sport and leisure
Ferring has an amateur football club, Ferring Football Club, which plays at the Glebelands.
Ferring Radio was a community licensed station broadcasting across the South Coast on 97.7fm originally for the benefit and experience of clients with special needs attending Ferring Country Centre. The station has been revived in 2020 on-line to provide music and local news and information during the extreme medical crisis and isolation.

References

External links

Villages in West Sussex
Arun District
Populated coastal places in West Sussex